James Craig MacDonald (born April 7, 1977) is a Canadian former professional ice hockey player who played parts of eight seasons in the National Hockey League (NHL). He is from the town of Antigonish in Nova Scotia, Canada.

Playing career
After gaining admission to Harvard University (where he majored in economics) MacDonald played for the Harvard varsity team before being drafted in the 4th round (88th overall) in the 1996 NHL Entry Draft by the Hartford Whalers.  His rights were transferred to Carolina when the franchise moved there in 1997.  After two years he joined the Canadian Olympic team in 1998, he signed with Carolina the following year, and played his first NHL game on January 7, 1999, against the Pittsburgh Penguins in the 1998–99 NHL season.  On January 20, 2004, MacDonald was claimed off waivers by the Boston Bruins.  On August 11, 2005, he signed as a free agent for the Calgary Flames.

While playing for the Florida Panthers, MacDonald was on a line with Marcus Nilson and Byron Ritchie that was named the John Deere line.  They got this name due to them working hard every shift.  The John Deere line was reunited in Calgary in the 2005–06 NHL season.  On July 2, 2007, MacDonald signed with the Tampa Bay Lightning.

On December 20, 2007, during a game versus the Toronto Maple Leafs, MacDonald was hit by a wrist shot from Toronto defenceman Hal Gill that fractured nine of MacDonald's teeth, only three of which were able to be salvaged. He also required 25–30 stitches to close a cut in his tongue and an additional 50 or so to sew together wounds to the inside of his lip and gums, according to team trainer Tom Mulligan. MacDonald also underwent three root canal surgeries the following morning.  He wore a full cage on his helmet to protect him from any further injury.

On July 14, 2008, MacDonald signed a one-year, two-way contract with the Columbus Blue Jackets. Craig is also one of the few NHL players who have attended Harvard. He left North America on June 30, 2009, and signed for German Deutsche Eishockey Liga team DEG Metro Stars. After one year with DEG Metro Stars signed on April 6, 2010, with fellow DEL team, Adler Mannheim.

In addition to having been a professional hockey player, MacDonald is also an accomplished golfer, having won two consecutive Nova Scotia Junior Golf Championship titles- and considered professional golf as a career before being signed by the Carolina Hurricanes of the NHL.

Career statistics

Regular season and playoffs

Awards and honors

References

External links

1977 births
Adler Mannheim players
Beast of New Haven players
Boston Bruins players
Calgary Flames players
Canadian ice hockey forwards
Canadian people of Scottish descent
Carolina Hurricanes players
Chicago Blackhawks players
Columbus Blue Jackets players
DEG Metro Stars players
Florida Panthers players
Hartford Whalers draft picks
Harvard Crimson men's ice hockey players
Ice hockey people from Nova Scotia
Living people
Lowell Lock Monsters players
Norfolk Admirals players
Omaha Ak-Sar-Ben Knights players
People from Antigonish, Nova Scotia
San Antonio Rampage players
Syracuse Crunch players
Tampa Bay Lightning players
Canadian expatriate ice hockey players in Germany